The Abbey of Saint Galgano was a Cistercian Monastery founded in the valley of the river Merse between the towns of Chiusdino and Monticiano, in the province of Siena, region of Tuscany, Italy. Presently, the roofless walls of the Gothic style 13th-century Abbey church still stand. Nearby are the chapel or Eremo or  Rotonda di Montesiepi (1185), the tomb of Saint Galgano and the purported site of his death in 1181, a sword said to have been driven into a stone by Galgano, and a chapel with frescoes by Ambrogio Lorenzetti.

History
The abbey formed around the site of the former hermitage of Galgano Guidotti (San Galgano), and construction of the church began around 1220, and was completed some six decades later. The abbey grew in wealth and became allied with the Republic of Siena. Monks from the abbey routinely served as Camarlinghi di Biccherna, i.e. high magistrates of the main financial institution of the republic.

However within a century, the republic failed to protect it from roving condottieri, and John Hawkwood and his men despoiled the monastery beginning in 1363. By the end of the 14th-century, only the abbot remained in the monastery.

The abbey stayed impoverished and kept decaying for nearly four centuries. Cardinal Giuseppe Maria Feroni was abbot from 1765 to 1767. In 1786, the campanile fell, taking with it the roof of the church. The ruins were looted for building material. Some restorations occurred in the 19th and 20th centuries, but the church remains a ruin. The long tall nave with its windows and an apse rose window still stand. The abbey's chapter house and part of the scriptorium also remain.

The Rotonda chapel was restored in 1924 and retains its peculiar medieval shape, similar to earlier Ancient Roman mausoleums.

Popular culture
The abbey was the location where parts of Andrei Tarkovsky's 1983 film Nostalghia were shot.

Gallery

See also
 History of medieval Arabic and Western European domes

References

External links

Benedictine monasteries in Italy
Gothic architecture in Tuscany
Monasteries in Tuscany
Buildings and structures in the Province of Siena
Religious organizations established in the 1180s
Christian monasteries established in the 13th century